ST45 is the name for a Polish diesel locomotive. They are freight only locomotives, having had their train heating removed.

History
These locomotives are SU45s with replacement engine and no train heating facilities. During 2009-2010 4 locomotives were rebuilt to class ST45.

Production
ST45-01 (converted from SU45-112)
ST45-02 (converted from SU45-238)
ST45-03 (converted from SU45-254)
ST45-04 (converted from SU45-240)

See also
Polish locomotives designation

References

External links

Modern Locos Gallery
Rail Service
Mikoleje
Chabówka Rail Museum

Co′Co′ locomotives
Diesel-electric locomotives of Poland
Railway locomotives introduced in 2009
Standard gauge locomotives of Poland